The 44th Writers Guild of America Awards honored the best television, and film writers of 1991. Winners were announced in 1992.

Winners & Nominees

Film 
Winners are listed first highlighted in boldface.

Television

Documentary

Special Awards

References

External links 

 WGA.org

1991
W
1991 in American cinema
1991 in American television